The Rats of Tobruk is a 1944 Australian film directed by Charles Chauvel. An abridged version was released in the United States in 1951 as The Fighting Rats of Tobruk. The film follows three drover friends who enlist in the Australian Army together during World War II.  Their story is based on the siege of the Libyan city of Tobruk in North Africa by Rommel's Afrika Korps. The largely Australian defenders held the city for 250 days before being relieved by British forces.

Plot
Three friends are droving cattle in Australia in 1939: the restless Bluey Donkin, easy-going Milo Trent and English Peter Linton, who is in the country on a working holiday. Squatter's daughter Kate Carmody is in love with Bluey but he refuses to be tied down to any one woman. War breaks out and the three men enlist in the Australian army and are assigned to the 9th Division. They ship out to Africa.

After early successes against the Italian army, the army is besieged in Tobruk. In between attacks, the men have comic encounters with a barber and Peter falls for a nurse, Sister Mary, after being wounded. There are several subsequent attacks in which all three soldiers are wounded. Peter Linton is killed but the others manage to repel the Germans.

Bluey and Milo are then transferred to New Guinea, where Bluey is injured and Milo killed by a sniper. Bluey manages to kill the sniper and returns to Australia, where he is reunited with Kate.

Cast
Grant Taylor as Bluey Donkin
Peter Finch as Peter Linton
Chips Rafferty as Milo Trent
George Wallace as the barber of Tobruk
Pauline Garrick as Kate Carmody
Mary Gay as Sister Mary Ellis
Joe Valli as the Northumberland Fusilier
John Sherwood
Walter Pym
Norman Blackler
Gilbert Ellis
Robert Carlyle
Joe Anderson
Toni Villa as Japanese soldier
Edward Esau as British officer who falls asleep in barber's chair

Production

Development
Chauvel made the film as a follow up to his enormously popular Forty Thousand Horsemen (1940). Like that movie, it follows three friends overseas to war, and starred Grant Taylor and Chips Rafferty.

In September 1941 Chauvel announced his follow up movie would have the background of the wool industry. That seemed to change and in November 1942 Chauvel announced plans to make a film about the Rats of Tobruk. He spent a year researching and writing, and securing government cooperation.

In July 1943 Variety reported Charles Munro would help finance two films of Chauvel, Rats of Tobruk and Fuzzy-wuzzies.

Financing was obtained from Hoyts, RKO-Radio, and Commonwealth Film Laboratories. Production of the movie was even announced in The New York Times.

Mary Gay was working as a clerk in a department store when discovered in a talent quest and cast in the role of the nurse who romances Peter Finch.

Shooting
Shooting took place in late 1943. Taylor, Rafferty and Finch were all serving in the Australian army and played their parts on leave. A set representing the town of Tobruk was constructed in a field near Camden. Underground firing posts and dugouts were reconstructed in the studio of Commonwealth Film Laboratories. The Cronulla sandhills stood in for the African desert, and battle scenes were shot there at nighttime. Watson's Bay was used to shoot scenes of Australian soldiers embarking by boat.

The New Guinea sequences were shot at Lamington Plateau, near the crash site of the 1937 Stinson plane. (That wreck had been discovered by Bernard O'Reilly who inspired Chauvel's later film, Sons of Matthew.) Army photographers also shot real-life footage in Papua for use in the movie. Filipino boxer Tony Villa plays the Japanese soldier who fights Grant Taylor at the end.

Captured German and Italian weaponry was used throughout filming. In 1943, the 3rd Army Tank Battalion was equipped with a squadron of Australian built Sentinel AC1 tanks which had been modified to resemble German tanks. The army provided advisers who had served in Tobruk.

Filming ended in June 1944.

Reception

Critical
The film received mixed reviews. The critic from the Argus thought it was better than Forty Thousand Horsemen but the one from the  Sydney Morning Herald claimed that:
The fictional background is dull and uninventive, the characterisation often stilted and self-consciously patterned to arbitrary types, and the editing loose and jumpy as the story which, in its amateurish nature, is a dead-weight on the entire production. The chief merits of the film, which was made in the face of great difficulties that may explain, but do not excuse, its weaknesses for a commercial market, are its reconstruction of Tobruk and the fidelity of its action scenes to historic fact. Yet, while these action scenes are truthful, their interpretation by the aim leaves their outlines and purposes vague so that an audience has to guess too much about who's fighting who and what the strategy is.
Filmink magazine later wrote "I’m not quite sure what Taylor did during his war service, but it was having its impact already by the time of this film – Taylor looks puffier, more balder, less enthusiastic. He’s still pretty good, just not as good as in Horseman – like the film itself really, which was a commercial disappointment."

Box office
Early box office response was encouraging but the movie was not as popular as Forty Thousand Horsemen.

US Release
It was not released in the US until 1951. The critic from The New York Times called the movie "one of the most harrowing bores in years from anywhere... most of the eighty five minutes is crawling agony... it's a toss up as to which is more primeval, Mr Chauvel's direction or the acting of the entire cast."

See also
The Desert Rats
Cinema of Australia

References

External links
The Rats of Tobruk  at the National Film and Sound Archive

The Rats of Tobruk at Australian Screen Online
US Trailer at Internet Archive
Original treatment  at National Archives of Australia
The Rats of Tobruk at Oz Movies
Review of film at Variety
Documentary footage of shooting in New Guinea the concluding scenes for Mr Charles Chauvel's film Rats of Tobruk at Australian War Memorial

1944 films
1940s war drama films
Australian war drama films
Australian World War II propaganda films
North African campaign films
Films directed by Charles Chauvel
Films set in Libya
Films set in Papua New Guinea
Siege films
Films set in 1939
Films set in 1941
Films set in 1942
Australian black-and-white films
1944 drama films
1940s Australian films